Tepesomoto–Pataste Nature Reserve is a nature reserve in Nicaragua. It is one of the 78 reserves that are under official protection in the country.

The reserve covers the mountain ridge running from Tepesomoto Volcano overlooking Somoto in the north, to the summit of Pataste near Las Sabanas in the south, that forms a natural barrier between the departments of Madriz and Estelí. It reaches heights of around 1700 metres at the two peaks of Tepesomoto and Pataste.

References

External links
 Natural Reserve La Pataste - Explore Nicaragua

Protected areas of Nicaragua
Estelí Department
Central American pine–oak forests